My Favourite Christmas Carols is the sixth studio album by Robin Gibb. Released in November 2006, it was the final studio album to be released in his lifetime and is the only album to be composed entirely of traditional Christmas songs.

The album was recorded from August to September 2006.

Album information
Recording took place in Dublin and London. The last song, "The First Noël" has new lyrics written by Gibb. The instrumental tracks are by Kwesi Graves (Although credited as Michael Graves on Magnet) including pipe organ and string sections and sometimes they push envelope with percussion beats. His version of "Good King Wenceslas" is missing two verses.

The album contains "Come Some Christmas Eve Or Halloween" a song by the Bee Gees from 1968 on Idea sessions. My Favourite Christmas Carols was released on 21 November 2006 at Germany by Edel Records, Hong Kong by Evolution Records and in the United States by Koch Records. The American release of the album omitted "Come Some Christmas Eve Or Halloween", "Ellan Vannin" and the medley. "Mother of Love" was released as a single the same month as the album, and was available to download on Musicload.

Track listing

German release

American release

Personnel
Robin Gibb – vocals
Kwesi Graves – Hammond organ, synthesizer, guitar, programming, choir arrangement
The Serlo Consort – background vocals
The Children's Choir of St Giles and St George, Ashtead – background vocals
Kit Persona-Wright – choir arrangement
Savvas Iossifidis – engineer

References

Robin Gibb albums
Christmas albums by English artists
Contemporary R&B Christmas albums
2006 Christmas albums
2006 albums